The 1943 New Jersey gubernatorial election was held on November 2, 1943. Republican nominee Walter Evans Edge defeated Democratic nominee Vincent J. Murphy with 55.20% of the vote.

Primary elections
Primary elections were held on September 21, 1943.

Republican primary

Candidates
Walter Evans Edge, former Governor and United States Senator

Results

Democratic primary

Candidates
Vincent J. Murphy, Mayor of Newark

Results

General election

Candidates
Major party candidates
Walter Evans Edge, Republican
Vincent J. Murphy, Democratic

Other candidates
John C. Butterworth, Socialist Labor Party of America
John Binns, Prohibition Party
Roy V. H. Wilkinson, Socialist Party of America

Results

References

1943
New Jersey
Gubernatorial
November 1943 events